The Golden Scarf is awarded by Seattle Sounders FC to "honor members of [the Seattle] community who are either part of the soccer scene or have done remarkable things for society in Seattle." It was renamed in honor of former majority owner Joe Roth in 2019.

During the pre-game ceremonies of the inaugural home match of the Sounders FC, a Golden Scarf emblazoned with the team name was awarded to MLS Commissioner Don Garber. This began a tradition where, before each home game, the club likewise honors a member of the community who has contributed to soccer or society more generally in the Seattle area.

The recipient and the fans then raise their scarves over their heads together.  The presenter of the Golden Scarf, usually a representative of the club's owners, is also acknowledged as part of the ceremony.

2009 Recipients

2010 Recipients

2011 Recipients

2012 Recipients

2013 Recipients

2014 Recipients

2015 Recipients

2016 Recipients

2017 Recipients

2018 Recipients

2019 Recipients

References

Seattle Sounders FC